A Burn or a Shiver is the debut studio album by American indie rock band Edison Glass, released on April 4, 2006 by Credential Recordings. It was produced by Brad Wood. The CD release show was held at a music store on Long Island, New York, the band's hometown.

Track listing

Edison Glass albums
Credential Recordings albums
2006 albums
Albums produced by Brad Wood